Anthony Bentem (born 19 March 1990) is a Dutch footballer who currently plays for amateur side Quick Boys.

Club career
Bentem played professionally for hometown club Sparta. He left the club after 12 years when his contract expired and moved to amateur outfit XerxesDZB in 2012. In summer 2014 he joined Quick Boys.

References

External links

Netherlands U17 stats at OnsOranje
Netherlands U21 stats at OnsOranje

1990 births
Living people
Footballers from Rotterdam
Association football fullbacks
Dutch footballers
Sparta Rotterdam players
XerxesDZB players
Quick Boys players
Eredivisie players
Eerste Divisie players